Marie Le Franc (October 4, 1879 – December 29, 1964) was a French-born writer who found much of her inspiration in Canada.

The daughter of a customs officer, she was born in Sarzeau and was educated at the École des soeurs de Sarzeau in Morbihan and at the École normale de Vannes, receiving her teaching diploma. She taught school in Morbihan for several years and then came to Montreal in 1906, where she planned to marry Arsène Bessette. The marriage never happened but Le Franc continued to teach in the region. She returned to France in 1929 but continued to visit Canada until 1958.

She published two volumes of poetry Les Voix du cœur et de l'âme (1920) and Les Voix de misère et d'allégresse, as well as novels and short stories. Her 1925 novel Grand-Louis l'innocent won the French Prix Femina. Her work also appeared in Le Mercure de France, the Album universel and Les Carnets viatoriens.

Le Franc was named a Chevalier in the French Legion of Honour in 1953.

She died in Saint-Germain-en-Laye at the age of 85.

Lac Marie-Le Franc in the Papineau-Labelle Wildlife Reserve was named in her honour in 1934.

Selected works 
 Le Poste sur la dûne, novel (1928)
 Hélier: fils des bois, novel (1930)
 Grand-Louis le Revenant, novel (1930)
 Dans l'île. Roman d'Ouessant, novel (1932)
 Visages de Montréal, stories (1934?)
 La Rivière solitaire, novel (1934)
 La Randonnée passionnée, novel (1936)
 Les Pêcheurs de Gaspésie, novel (1938)
 O Canada, Terre de nos aïeux !, stories (1947)
 Le Fils de la forêt, novel (1952)

References

External links
  Archives of Marie Le Franc (Fonds Marie Le Franc, R11765) are held at Library and Archives Canada

1879 births
1964 deaths
French women poets
French women novelists
Chevaliers of the Légion d'honneur
Prix Femina winners
French expatriates in Canada